Antoniów  is a village in the administrative district of Gmina Stara Kamienica, within Jelenia Góra County, Lower Silesian Voivodeship, in south-western Poland.

During World War II, the Germans established and operated a forced labour camp in the village, in which they imprisoned Italian and Soviet prisoners of war. The prisoners lived and worked in poor sanitary conditions, and were forced to exhausting labour.

References

Villages in Karkonosze County